Richmond is a home rule-class city in and the county seat of Madison County, Kentucky, United States. It is named after Richmond, Virginia, and is home to Eastern Kentucky University. In 2019, the population was 36,157. Richmond is the fourth-largest city in the Bluegrass region (after Louisville, Lexington and Covington) and the state's sixth-largest city. It is the ninth largest population center in the state with a Micropolitan population of 106,864. The city serves as the center for work and shopping for south-central Kentucky. In addition, Richmond is the principal city of the Richmond-Berea, Kentucky Micropolitan Area, which includes all of Madison and Rockcastle counties.

History
Richmond was founded in 1798 by Colonel John Miller from Richmond, Virginia. A British American, Miller served with the rebels in the Revolutionary War. According to lore, he was attracted to the area by its good spring water and friendly Native Americans.

With the original county seat of Madison County being Milford, Kentucky, Miller successfully lobbied the Kentucky legislature to move it from Milford to present-day Richmond. Although the residents of Milford strongly opposed the move, the county approved the transfer in March 1798. On July 4, 1798, the new town was named Richmond in honor of Miller's Virginia birthplace. Richmond was incorporated in 1809.

Kentucky was a border state during the Civil War and remained in the Union. On August 30, 1862, during the Civil War, the Battle of Richmond took place. Confederate General Edmund Kirby Smith routed the Union General William Nelson, capturing or killing 5,300 of his 6,500 men. One historian called this battle "the nearest thing to a Cannae ever scored by any general, North or South, in the course of the whole war."

In 1906, Eastern Kentucky State Normal School was founded in Richmond to train teachers. The school graduated its first class of 11 teachers in 1909. In 1922, it was established as a four-year college and in 1935 added a graduate degree program. In 1965, the institution was renamed Eastern Kentucky University.

In the late 1990s and early 2000s, Richmond saw significant growth, becoming the state's seventh-largest city in 2009.

Geography

Richmond is located in Madison County in the Bluegrass region of the state. The Blue Grass Army Depot lies to the southeast of the city. The city is served by Interstate 75, U. S. Routes 25 and 421, and Kentucky Routes 52, 169 and 388. I-75 runs to the west of downtown, with access from exits 83, 87, and 90. U.S. Route 25 forms the eastern bypass around the city, leading northwest to Lexington and south  to Berea. U.S. Route 421 parallels U.S. 25 on the eastern bypass of the city, leading northwest to Lexington (with U.S. 25 and I-75) and southeast  to McKee.

Climate
The climate in this area is characterized by hot, humid summers and generally mild to cool winters. According to the Köppen Climate Classification system, Richmond has a humid subtropical climate, abbreviated "Cfa" on climate maps.

Demographics

As of the census of 2000, there were 27,152 people, 10,795 households, and 5,548 families residing in the city. The racial makeup of the city was 88.30% White, 8.27% African American, 0.29% Native American, 1.09% Asian, 0.03% Pacific Islander, 0.43% from other races, and 1.58% from two or more races. Hispanic or Latino of any race were 1.21% of the population.

There were 10,795 households, out of which 24.4% had children under the age of 18 living with them, 35.2% were married couples living together, 12.8% had a female householder with no husband present, and 48.6% were non-families. 34.7% of all households were made up of individuals, and 8.8% had someone living alone who was 65 years of age or older. The average household size was 2.14 and the average family size was 2.78.

In the city, the population was spread out, with 17.5% under the age of 18, 31.7% from 18 to 24, 27.5% from 25 to 44, 13.8% from 45 to 64, and 9.5% who were 65 years of age or older. The median age was 25 years. For every 100 females, there were 90.4 males. For every 100 females age 18 and over, there were 87.8 males.

The median income for a household in the city was $25,533, and the median income for a family was $36,222. Males had a median income of $30,817 versus $22,053 for females. The per capita income for the city was $15,815. About 16.6% of families and 25.0% of the population were below the poverty line, including 26.2% of those under age 18 and 19.9% of those aged 65 or over.

Government
Richmond operates under a council–manager government. The citizens elect a mayor and four city commissioners who form the Board of Commissioners. The Board of Commissioners is the legislative body of the city government and represents the interests of the citizens when applicable. The Board of Commissioners appoints a city manager, who administers the day-to-day operations of the city.

The mayor is elected for a term of four years. Each city commissioner is elected for a term of two years. The term of the city manager is indefinite.

Education
Richmond is served by the Madison County Public School System. In 1988 the Richmond Independent School District merged into the Madison County school district.

High schools
 Model Laboratory School (Associated with Eastern Kentucky University)
 Madison Central High School

Higher education
 Eastern Kentucky University

Public library
Richmond has a lending library, a branch of the Madison County Public Library.

Media

Newspaper
The Richmond Register is published on Tuesday through Saturday publication. The Eastern Progress is a weekly student publication of Eastern Kentucky University

Radio stations
 WEKY (1340 AM)
 WCBR (1110 AM)
 WEKU (88.9 FM)
 WLXX (101.5 FM)

Transportation

Roads
Interstate 75 passes through western Richmond, and connects the city to Lexington in the north and Knoxville, Tennessee in the south. I-75 has three exits in the city: U.S. Route 25, State Route 876, and S.R. 2872.

Richmond is located on a concurrency with U.S. Route 25 and 421. The two routes run north to Lexington and diverge approximately five miles south of the city. U.S. 25 connects the city to Berea and Mount Vernon in the south. U.S. 421 connects to McKee in the south east.

State Route 52 connects to Lancaster in the west and Irvine in the east. State Route 169 heads northwest toward Nicholasville. State Route 388 runs north of the city to the north end of the county and Boonesborough. State Route 876 serves as a bypass around the business district of the city and heads west toward Kentucky Route 595, which continues to Round Hill and Kirksville. State Route 1156 heads northeast and connects with State Route 169 at Valley View. State Route 1986 runs northeast of Richmond to Union City and Doylesville. The U.S. 25 connector, signed as S.R. 2872 and commonly known as Duncannon Lane, connects I-75 to U.S. 25 south of the city. State Route 2881 connects at State Route 52 at Caleast, runs through southern Richmond, and heads south to Berea.

Air
Central Kentucky Regional Airport is a public airport located in Madison County between Richmond and Berea. It consists of a 5,001 by 100 ft asphalt runway.

Bus
Foothills Express, operated by the Kentucky River Foothills Development Council, provides the Richmond Transit Service bus service within Richmond, the Big E Transit Service on the EKU campus, Madison County Connector service to Berea, and local and intercity demand-responsive transport.

Notable people
 Daniel Boone (November 2, 1734 – September 26, 1820), born in Birdsboro, PA, he was an American pioneer who established Fort Boonesborough, in Madison County Kentucky along the Kentucky River
 Kit Carson, pioneer frontiersman, born near Richmond in Madison County, Kentucky, but raised in Franklin, Missouri
 Brutus J. Clay II, son of Cassius M. Clay and Minister to Switzerland
 Cassius Marcellus Clay, planter, abolitionist and politician; Minister to Spain and Russia, a founder of the Republican Party
 Earle Combs, New York Yankees player, Baseball Hall of Fame member; longtime resident of the area 
 David R. Francis, Mayor of St. Louis, Governor of Missouri and U.S. Secretary of the Interior; born in Richmond
 Odon Guitar, brigadier general in the Union Missouri State Militia in the American Civil War
 Leigh Ann Hester of the Kentucky Army National Guard, first woman in United States military history to be cited for valor in close quarters combat, for action near Salman Pak, Iraq on March 20, 2005; she is the first woman to receive the Silver Star Medal for valor in combat
 Keen Johnson, editor of the Richmond Daily Register (1925–39); Lieutenant Governor of Kentucky (1935–39); Governor of Kentucky (1939–43); Undersecretary of Labor (1946–47); longtime resident of the area
 James B. McCreary, United States Senator and two-term Governor of Kentucky
 Samuel Freeman Miller, U.S. Supreme Court Justice
 Fiddlin' Doc Roberts (April 26, 1897 – August 4, 1978), old-time bluegrass fiddler 
 Jimmy Stokley (October 18, 1943 – August 13, 1985), lead singer, co-founder and member of the band Exile  
 Samuel Hanson Stone, Kentucky politician, born near Richmond
 William J. Stone, Governor of Missouri, born near Richmond
 Montez Sweat, NFL Defensive End (2019-)
 Ken Upchurch, member of the Kentucky House of Representatives from Wayne County; born in Richmond in 1969
 Larry Warford, NFL offensive lineman (1991-)
 John Reid Wolfskill, California pioneer

See also

 Other places named Richmond

References

External links

 
 City of Richmond
 

 
Cities in Madison County, Kentucky
Cities in Kentucky
County seats in Kentucky
Richmond–Berea micropolitan area
1798 establishments in Kentucky